Zaprochilus, the twig-mimicking katydids, is a genus of bush crickets or katydids in the subfamily Zaprochilinae. They are found in Australia.

Species
The genus Zaprochilus contains the following species:
 Zaprochilus australis (Brullé, 1835) - type species
 Zaprochilus jingemarra Rentz, 1993
 Zaprochilus mongabarra Rentz, 1993
 Zaprochilus ninae Rentz, 1993

References

Tettigoniidae
Tettigoniidae genera
Orthoptera of Australia
Taxonomy articles created by Polbot